The men's 200 metres event was part of the track and field athletics programme at the 1924 Summer Olympics. The first two rounds were held on 8 July, with the semifinals and final on 9 July. Sixty-five sprinters from 33 countries competed. Nations were limited to 4 athletes each. The event was won by Jackson Scholz of the United States, the nation's third consecutive victory in the event and fifth in six Games. For the third straight Games, the podium consisted of two Americans winning gold and silver (Charley Paddock) and a Brit taking bronze (Eric Liddell). Paddock, the silver medalist in 1920 as well, was the second man to earn multiple medals in the 200 metres.

Background

This was the sixth appearance of the event, which was not held at the first Olympics in 1896 but has been on the program ever since. One of the six finalists from the 1920 Games returned: silver medalist Charley Paddock of the United States.

Argentina, Brazil, Haiti, Ireland, Latvia, Mexico, the Philippines, Poland, Turkey, and Yugoslavia each made their debut in the event. The United States made its sixth appearance, the only nation to have competed at each edition of the 200 metres to date.

Competition format

The competition used the four round format introduced in 1920: heats, quarterfinals, semifinals, and a final. There were 17 heats of between 3 and 5 runners each, with the top 2 men in each advancing to the quarterfinals. The quarterfinals consisted of 6 heats of between 5 and 6 athletes each; the two fastest men in each heat advanced to the semifinals. There were 2 semifinals, each with 6 runners. In that round, the top three athletes advanced. The final had 6 runners.

The race was run on a 500-metre track, the last time the Olympics used a track with a different length than the now-standard 400 metres.

Records

Prior to this competition, the existing world and Olympic records were as follows:

Jackson Scholz of the United States tied the Olympic record in the final.

Schedule

Results

All times shown are in seconds.

Heats

The first round was held on 8 July. The first two runners of each heat qualified for the second round.

Heat 1

Heat 2

Heat 3

Heat 4

Heat 5

Heat 6

Heat 7

Heat 8

Heat 9

Heat 10

Heat 11

Heat 12

Heat 13

Heat 14

Heat 15

Heat 16

Heat 17

Quarterfinals

The quarterfinals were held on 8 July. The first two runners of each heat qualified for the semifinals.

Quarterfinal 1

Quarterfinal 2

Quarterfinal 3

Quarterfinal 4

Quarterfinal 5

Quarterfinal 6

Semifinals

The semifinals were held on 9 July. The first three runners from each semifinal qualified for the final.

Semifinal 1

Semifinal 2

Final

The final was held on 9 July.

References

 https://web.archive.org/web/20100904130200/http://www.databaseolympics.com/games/gamessport.htm?g=8&sp=ATH
 
 

Men's 00200 metres
200 metres at the Olympics